This article concerns the period 669 BC – 660 BC.

Events
 669 BC: Taharqa, king of Kush, invades and reconquers Egypt from the Assyrian Empire.
 669 BC: Esarhaddon, king of Assyria, dies in Harran on his way to recover Egypt.
 668 BC: Ashurbanipal, son of Esarhaddon, starts to rule Assyria.
 668 BC: Shamash-shum-ukin, son of Esarhaddon, becomes King of Babylon.
 668 BC: Nineveh, capital of Assyria becomes the largest city of the world, taking the lead from Thebes in Egypt (estimation).
 667 BC: Traditional date of the founding of Byzantium by Megaran colonists under Byzas.
 666 BC: Ashurbanipal sends a small Assyrian army corps to Egypt which recovers Lower Egypt from Taharqa's forces.
 664 BC: First naval battle in Greek recorded history, between Corinth and Corcyra.
 664 BC: Tantamani succeeds his uncle Taharqa as king of Kush. He invades Egypt to try to take it back.
 664 BC: Necho I, puppet Pharaoh of Egypt, is killed by invading Kushite forces under Tantamani.
 663 BC: Assyrian army captures and sacks Thebes, Egypt, ending the Nubian period in Egypt.
 660 BC: Traditional founding date of Japan by Emperor Jimmu on 11 February.
 660 BC: First known use of the Demotic script.
 660 BC: Mythical founding of the Japanese royal family.

At a slightly uncertain date in the latter part of this decade, there was an  extreme solar particle event comparable with the event detected in AD 774/775 The exact date, and duration of the event is unclear due in part to an approximate 2-year residence time of the nuclei generated in the atmosphere, before they "rained out" to be incorporated into tree rings and glacial ice, but the event seems to have happened in the latter part of this decade. The possibility of there being a series of events spread over a period of time remains in consideration. What meteorological and astronomical phenomena would have accompanied this event remains an open question. The estimated "brightness" of the event is about 2 orders of magnitude stronger than any that has been instrumentally recorded since the dawn of the Space Age.

References